The Battle of Hermannstadt, also known as the Battle of Sibiu or the Battle of Szeben, was fought between the army of the Hungarian Kingdom and the Ottoman Empire on March 18 and March 22, 1442, near Marosszentimre and Hermannstadt (Szeben), (today Sântimbru and Sibiu, Romania). The Hungarian forces were commanded by John Hunyadi. Hermannstadt was Hunyadi's third victory over the Ottomans after the relief of Smederevo in 1437 and the defeat of Ishak Beg midway between Semendria and Belgrade in 1441.

Background
In 1438 Ottoman marauders attacked Transylvania, where in 1437 the Ottomans had been beaten by an uprising under Antal Nagy de Buda. For up to 45 days the Ottomans without let or hindrance attacked the Transylvanian Saxon lands and Hungarian villages and market towns.

In 1441 John Hunyadi came to power. Hunyadi attacked the Ottomans in Serbia and at the Battle of Smederevo got the best of Ishak bey. The Ottoman Sultan, Murad II, proclaimed  in the autumn of 1441 that a raid into Hungarian Transylvania would take place in March 1442. In early March 1442, the marcher lord Mezid Bey led 16,000 akinji cavalry raiders into Transylvania, crossing the Danube to Wallachia at Nicopolis and marching north in formation.

Battle
On March 18 bishop György Lépes' forces (2,000 men) clashed with Mezid near Sântimbru. The Ottomans won by forces of numbers and Hunyadi was forced to retreat, but Mezid did not pursue Hunyadi. Lépes was taken prisoner and Mezid beheaded the bishop.

Hunyadi's army regrouped near Hermannstadt. Simon Kemény (sometimes: Kamonyai) swapped his armour for Hunyadi's armour so that the Turks would believe he was Hunyadi. Kamonyai was to execute a head-on attack, while Hunyadi went around Mesid's army. Kamonyai was killed in action, however Hunyadi with the Hungarian heavy cavalry charged Mesid, crushed the Turks and killed Mezid. Hunyadi was able to ransom Lépes's head with Mesid's head.

Outcome
In retaliation for Mezid's defeat and death, Shehabbedin, the beylerbey of Rumelia, invaded Transylvania. In the Battle of the Iron Gate, near the Danube, Hunyadi wiped out Shehabbedin's army in the second greatest victory of Hunyadi's career, surpassed only by his rout of the Ottoman sultan's army in 1456 at the Siege of Belgrade.

Citations

References

Sources
Pál Földi. Nagy hadvezérek ("Great Warlords"), Anno Publisher, 

Hermannstadt
Hermannstadt
Hermannstadt
Hermannstadt
Military history of Hungary
History of Sibiu County
15th century in Hungary
15th century in Transylvania
15th century in Romania
1440s in the Ottoman Empire
Hermannstadt
1442 in Europe